The Devil's Elixirs is a 1815 novel by E. T. A. Hoffmann.The basic idea for the story was adopted from Matthew Gregory Lewis's novel The Monk, which is itself mentioned in the text.

Although Hoffmann himself was not particularly religious, he was nevertheless so strongly impressed by the life and atmosphere on a visit to a monastery of the Order of Friars Minor Capuchin, that he determined to write the novel in that religious setting. Characteristically for Hoffmann, he wrote the entire novel in only a few weeks. The Devil's Elixirs is described by some literary critics as fitting into the Gothic novel genre (called Schauerroman in German). It can be classified in the subgenre of dark romanticism.

Plot
The Devil's Elixirs is predominantly a first-person narrative related by the Capuchin monk Medardus. He is ignorant of his family history and what he knows about his childhood is based upon fragments of memory and a few events his mother has explained to him.

Medardus cannot resist the devil's elixir, which has been entrusted to him and which awakens in him sensual desires. After being sent from his cloister to Rome, he finds a Count, disguised as a monk as a means of seeing his lover, and pushes him (whether intentionally or not is ambiguous) from a "Teufelssitz" ("devil's perch"). Unbeknownst to all involved, the Count is Medardus's half-brother and the Count's lover is his half-sister. The Count becomes his lunatic doppelgänger and crosses his path multiple times after Medardus abandons his ecclesiastical position, drifting throughout the world.

The story centers on his love for a young princess, Aurelie. After murdering her stepmother (the above-mentioned half-sister) and brother, Medardus flees to a city. After his devilish connection is found out by an old painter, Medardus flees the city with the help of a "foolish" hair dresser with two personalities, who serves as a foil to the destructive dual identity of Medardus, gaily living as both Peter Schoenfeld and Pietro Belcampo. He arrives at a prince's court, soon followed by Aurelie. She recognizes the monk as her brother's murderer and Medardus is thrown in jail. He is released only after the doppelgänger appears and is taken as the murderer.

Having passed himself off for a Polish noble while in prison he is engaged to Aurelie. On their wedding day however, he is overcome by a fit of madness, hearing the voice of the doppelgänger, which has been occurring ever more frequently to this point; he stabs Aurelie, frees the doppelgänger as he was being taken to his execution, and runs about the wilderness fighting the doppelgänger for months until he awakens in an Italian cloister, once more saved by Pietro/Peter. He is once more wearing his frock with the name Medardus stitched on it.

Returned to his original identity Medardus undergoes an intense process of repentance and discovers his family history by reading the diary of a painter. After meeting with the Pope and becoming involved in potentially fatal Vatican political intrigue (which suggest he may still have devilish ambitions to power) Medardus returns to the German cloister. A great fest is being held – Aurelie is soon to take her final vows to become a nun. Once again he must struggle with his lust. Just as he seems to have mastered it the doppelgänger rushes in and stabs Aurelie, fatally this time, and once more escapes. At the end, he writes this manuscript as an act of penance. A final note from the librarian of the cloister reveals circumstances of his death – namely a hysterical laughing which casts doubt on his implied redemption from satanic possession. (or – since he dies in a calm sleep precisely a year after Aurelie, he did repent; and the laughter was given out by his half-brother, still lurking in the cloister's hidden chambers, still embodying the evil part of the protagonist's personality, and still needing time to repent, which he could do after joining the cloister as a monk with Leonardus' help).

References

External links
The full text at Zeno.org (in German)
The full audiobook at Archive.org (in German)

1815 German novels
German fantasy novels
1810s fantasy novels
Novels by E. T. A. Hoffmann
Works published under a pseudonym
Works set in monasteries
German Gothic novels
German novels adapted into films